Chalcidoptera pryeri is a moth in the family Crambidae. It was described by George Hampson in 1898. It is found on Borneo.

The wingspan is about 20 mm. The forewings are deep red with a fuscous costa and a small yellow spot in the end of the cell, as well as a large lunulate (crescent-shaped) spot beyond the cell. The costal and inner areas and the termen on the hindwings are fuscous.

References

Moths described in 1899
Spilomelinae